Thierry Ramos da Graça (born 27 January 1995) is a Cape Verdean professional footballer who plays as a goalkeeper.

Club career
He started his career in Cape Verde. In 2013, he joined Portuguese club AD Oeiras to play in the U-19 league before moving to Benfica's youth team in the middle of the season.

On 6 May 2014, he, Rafael Ramos and Estrela signed a professional contract with S.L. Benfica until June 2020, joining the B-team in the following season. On 1 October 2014, he made his professional debut for Benfica B in a 1–1 draw against Santa Clara.

On 3 June 2016, he signed for Primeira Liga side G.D. Estoril Praia.

International career
Graça made his international debut for the Cape Verde national team in a 3–0 win over Tanzania for the 2019 Africa Cup of Nations qualification, on 12 October 2018.

Honours
Benfica
UEFA Youth League: Runner-up 2013–14

References

External links
 
 

1995 births
Living people
People from Mindelo
Cape Verdean footballers
Cape Verde international footballers
Association football goalkeepers
S.L. Benfica B players
G.D. Estoril Praia players
Doxa Katokopias FC players
Amora F.C. players
Primeira Liga players
Liga Portugal 2 players
Campeonato de Portugal (league) players
Cypriot First Division players
Cape Verdean expatriate footballers
Expatriate footballers in Portugal
Cape Verdean expatriate sportspeople in Portugal
Expatriate footballers in Cyprus
Cape Verdean expatriate sportspeople in Cyprus